George Webb may refer to:
 George Webb (bishop) (1594–1642), Anglican bishop in Ireland
 George James Webb (1803–1887), British-American composer
 George Webb (judge) (1828–1891), judge of the Supreme Court of Victoria
 George William Webb (1853–1936), Scottish born architect
 George Webb (politician) (1886–1958), member of Canadian Parliament
 George A. J. Webb (1861–1949), Australian portrait painter
 George C. Webb, American art director
 George Webb (actor) (1912–1998), English actor
 George Webb (musician) (1917–2010), British jazz musician

Sportspeople
 George Webb (cricketer) (1857–1931), English cricketer
 George Webb (footballer, born 1888) (–1915), English international football player for West Ham United
 George Webb (footballer, born 1991), English football player for Bournemouth

See also
 George Webb Restaurants, a Wisconsin restaurant chain
 George Webbe (disambiguation)